A Shoulder to Cry On may refer to:
 A Shoulder to Cry On (Charley Pride song)
 A Shoulder to Cry On (Tommy Page song)